Longleaf School of the Arts is a college preparatory charter high school in Raleigh, North Carolina, established in 2013. The school enrolls incoming freshman sophomores and juniors. Longleaf has 400+ students as of the 2022-2023 school year with a roster of 20+ full-time teachers. Longleaf's offered arts include: Visual, Literary, Dance, Chorus, Band, Orchestra, and Theatre. The foreign languages offered are French and Spanish.

References 

Public high schools in North Carolina
Educational institutions established in 2013
Schools in Raleigh, North Carolina
Charter schools in North Carolina
2013 establishments in North Carolina